Victor Puşcaş (born 18 July 1943) is a Moldovan politician.

He served as a member of the Parliament of Moldova (1990–1994), Minister for Relations with Parliament (1994–1995), Chairman of the Supreme Court of Justice of Moldova (1995–2001), President of the Superior Council of Magistrates (1998–2001) and Chairman of the Constitutional Court of Moldova (2001–2007).

External links 
 Biografia sa pe situl Curţii Constituţionale a Republicii Moldova
 Decretul nr. 57 din 17 martie 1995 cu privire la conferirea gradului superior de calificare de judecător dlui Victor Puşcaş, Preşedintele Judecătoriei Supreme
 Cine au fost şi ce fac deputaţii primului Parlament din R. Moldova (1990-1994)?
 Declaraţia deputaţilor din primul Parlament
 Site-ul Parlamentului Republicii Moldova

References 

1943 births
Living people
Moldova State University alumni
Moldovan MPs 1990–1994
Deputy Presidents of the Moldovan Parliament
Popular Front of Moldova MPs
Recipients of the Order of the Republic (Moldova)
Constitutional Court of Moldova judges

Recipients of the Order of Honour (Moldova)